Out of Sync is a 2021 film with fantasy and thriller elements directed by Juanjo Giménez which stars Marta Nieto and Miki Esparbé. It is a Spanish-Lithuanian-French co-production.

Premise 
The brain of C., a sound designer, is beginning to process sound later than visual images. Likewise, she also acquires the ability to hear what had happened in a place she had not been previously.

Cast 
 Marta Nieto as C.
 Miki Esparbé as Iván.

Production 
Tres is a joint Spain–Lithuania–France international co-production, produced by Frida Films, Nadir Films, M-Films and Manny Films. It received help from the ICAA, and it had participation of TVG, TV3, Canal+, also receiving funding from MEDIA and Eurimages. It was directed by Juanjo Giménez, who also wrote the screenplay alongside Pere Altimira.

Release 
The film made its world premiere at the 18th Venice Days, and it was also screened at the Toronto Film Festival and the Sitges Film Festival. Distributed by Filmax, the film was theatrically released in Spain on 5 November 2021. Le Pacte handles the international sales.

Reception 
Reviewing for El Periódico de Catalunya, Beatriz Martínez gave Out of Sync 4 out of 5 stars, considering the film to be "an allegory of the loss of links with reality when everything around us crumbles", labelling the number of (different) layers in the film as "prodigious".

Sergi Sánchez of La Razón gave it 5 out of 5 stars, extolling how "it approaches sound with an unusual aesthetic rigour, never forgetting to delve into the emotional journey of its protagonist", while warning that its risky formal proposal may put off more than one viewer.

Carlos Marañón of Cinemanía gave the film 3.5 out of 5 stars, writing that the film proposes "a story underpinned by the opposition between silence and sound", in a manner as effective as it is disquieting, "which brings us back to the simplicity of pure cinema".

Ricardo Rosado of Fotogramas gave the film 4 out of 5 stars, highlighting both 1) the prominence of the film's premise over melodrama; and 2) Marta Nieto, to be the best things about the film.

Accolades 

|-
| align = "center" | 2021 || 27th Forqué Awards || Best Film Actress || Marta Nieto ||  || 
|-
| align ="center" rowspan ="18" | 2022 || rowspan ="3"| 9th Feroz Awards || colspan ="2" | Best Drama Film ||  || rowspan="3" | 
|-
| Best Screenplay || Juanjo Giménez, Pere Altimira || 
|-
| Best Actress (film) || Marta Nieto || 
|-
| rowspan = "2" | 36th Goya Awards || Best Original Screenplay || Juanjo Giménez Peña & Pere Altimira ||  || rowspan = "2" | 
|-
| Best Sound || Daniel Fontrodona, Oriol Tarragó, Marc Bech, Marc Orts || 
|-
| rowspan = "6" | 14th Gaudí Awards || colspan = "2" | Best Non-Catalan Language Film ||  || rowspan = "6" | 
|-
| Best Screenplay || Juanjo Giménez, Pere Altimira || 
|-
| Best Actress || Marta Nieto || 
|-
| Best Supporting Actor || Miki Esparbé || 
|-
| Best Sound || Daniel Fontrodona, Oriol Tarragó, Marc Bech, Marc Orts || 
|-
| colspan = "2" | Public's Choice Award for Best Film || 
|-
| rowspan = "6" | 20th  Mestre Mateo Awards || colspan = "2" | Best Film ||  || rowspan = "6" | 
|-
| Best Art Direction || Antonio Pereira || 
|-
| Best Production Supervision || Miriam Devesa || 
|-
| Best Screenplay || Juanjo Giménez, Pere Altimira || 
|-
| Best Actress || Marta Nieto || 
|-
| Best Sound || Daniel Fontrodona, Oriol Tarragó, Marc Bech, Mart Orts || 
|-
| 66th Sant Jordi Awards || colspan = "2" | Best Debut Feature ||  || 
|}

See also 
 List of Spanish films of 2021
 List of French films of 2021

References

External links 
 
 Out of Sync at ICAA's Catálogo de Cinespañol

2020s Spanish-language films
2021 films
Spanish thriller films
Lithuanian thriller films
French thriller films
Spanish fantasy films
2021 fantasy films
2020s Spanish films
2020s French films